Elections to Metropolitan Borough of Southwark were held in 1962.  These were the last elections before the borough became part of the London Borough of Southwark in 1965.

The borough had ten wards which returned between 3 and 8 members. Labour won all the seats and no other party stood a full set of candidates.

Election result

|}

References

Council elections in the London Borough of Southwark
1962 in London
1962 English local elections